Almirante is the Spanish and Portuguese word for admiral. It may also refer to:

Places
 Almirante, original name of Laurel Hill, Florida, a city in U.S.
 Almirante, Bocas del Toro, a city in Panama
 Almirante District, a district of Bocas del Toro Province in Panama
 Almirante Ice Fringe, Graham Land, Antarctica

Other uses
 Almirante (board game), a Portuguese strategy board game

See also
 Amirante (disambiguation)
 Almirante (surname), a surname (including a list of people with the name)
 Almirante Williams (disambiguation)